Jennifer Mary Jacobs (8 March 1956 – 21 July 2016) was an Australian cricketer who played as a right-arm off break bowler and right-handed batter. She appeared in seven Test matches and 13 One Day Internationals for Australia between 1979 and 1984. She played domestic cricket for South Australia and Victoria.

References

External links
 
 
 Jen Jacobs at southernstars.org.au

1956 births
2016 deaths
Cricketers from Adelaide
Australia women Test cricketers
Australia women One Day International cricketers
South Australian Scorpions cricketers
Victoria women cricketers